Dakota High School is a public, magnet high school located in the Metropolitan Detroit region, situated in the suburb of Macomb Township, Michigan. Dakota serves grades 9-12 and is one of two high schools in the Chippewa Valley Schools.

Academics

Dakota High School has been accredited by Cognia or its predecessors since April 1, 1996.

Demographics
The demographic breakdown of the 2,996 students enrolled in 2017-18 was:
Male - 50.6%
Female -49.4%
Native American/Alaskan Native - 0.1%
Asian - 3.4%
Black - 7.8%
Hispanic - 3.0%
Native Hawaiian/Pacific islanders - 0.2%
Non-Hispanic White - 82.4%
Multiracial - 3.1%

19.1% of the students were eligible for free or reduced-cost lunch.

Athletics
The football team won state championships in 2006 and 2007.

Notable alumni
Kyle Cook - NFL football center
Ryan Rollins - Shooting Guard for the Golden State Warriors

References

External links

Public high schools in Michigan
Educational institutions established in 1995
Schools in Macomb County, Michigan
1995 establishments in Michigan